Bedmet is a Polish company in the transport industry, founded on September 24, 1996, in Opole, Poland by Wiesław Bednarz.

The company specializes in the transport of very large and heavy goods, such as wind turbines, bridge sections, tunnel boring machines and the like.

Bedmet's exceptional transports features in a National Geographic documentary film.

References

External links
Bedmet's website.
Film about a transport of a cylinder of 145 tons carried out by Bedmet.

Transport
Logistics
Companies established in 1996
Polish brands
Companies of Poland